Dan Ibsen Sørensen (born 5 October 1954) is a Danish sailor. He competed in the 470 event at the 1976 Summer Olympics.

References

External links
 

1954 births
Living people
Danish male sailors (sport)
Olympic sailors of Denmark
Sailors at the 1976 Summer Olympics – 470
Sportspeople from Frederiksberg